The Theodore Presser Company is an American music publishing and distribution company located in Malvern, Pennsylvania, formerly King of Prussia, Pennsylvania, and originally based in Bryn Mawr, Pennsylvania. It is the oldest continuing music publisher in the United States. It has been owned by Carl Fischer Music since 2004.

History

Theodore Presser

Theodore Presser was born July 3, 1848, in Pittsburgh, Pennsylvania, to German emigrant Christian Presser and Caroline Dietz.  As a young man, he worked in an iron foundry helping to mold cannon balls for the army during the Civil War. This activity proved too strenuous for his young physique, and at 16, he began selling tickets for the Strokosch Opera Company in Pittsburgh.  In 1864, he began working as a clerk at C.C. Mellor's music store in Pittsburgh. He eventually achieved the position of sheet-music department manager.
 
Presser began his musical studies at 19 by learning to play the piano. At 20, he began studies music at Mt. Union College, where he stayed for a year, and then worked as a piano teacher at Ohio Northern University for two years. Further studies were completed at Miami Conservatory of Music, the New England Conservatory, and the Leipzig Conservatory in Germany under Reinecke, Jadassoh, and Zwintscher. His late start in learning to play the piano handicapped his technique.

He is credited as the founder of the Department of Music at Ohio Wesleyan University, where he taught 1876–1878. While there, he founded the Music Teachers National Association. His studies in Germany lasted from 1878 to 1880.  He then became director of music at Hollins College in Roanoke, Virginia. In October 1883, while working at Hollins, he began publication of The Etude music magazine with only $250 in cash. The immediate success of his new magazine prompted him to seek larger publishing facilities in Philadelphia, Pennsylvania in 1884.

Presser died in Philadelphia on October 28, 1925.  He married Helen Louise Curran (1890; d. 1905) and Elise Houston (1908; d. 1922).  He is interred at West Laurel Hill Cemetery in Bala Cynwyd, Pennsylvania.

The Presser Company
Presser's need for music content within The Etude resulted in his establishment as a dealer and publisher.

Following the purchase of the John Church Company in 1930, the Theodore Presser Company acquired the Oliver Ditson Company in 1931. Through this acquisition, Presser traces its origins to 1783, when Batelle's Book Store (later the Oliver Ditson Company), began a music-publishing business in Boston, Massachusetts.

In 1972, the Theodore Presser Company acquired Elkan-Vogel and its locally represented agencies (including Hamelle et cie., Henry Lemoine et cie., and others), making the Theodore Presser Company a major distributor of French music in the United States.

On August 31, 2004, Presser closed its retail music stores in both King of Prussia and Center City Philadelphia. The company now focuses primarily on publishing and distribution activities from its headquarters.

In 2017, Presser acquired Columbia Music Company, founded by Sophocles Papas. Other subsidiaries include Editions Orphée, Elkan-Vogel, Falls House Press, and Merion Music.

In addition to its own catalog, Presser represents the music of more than 70 U.S. and foreign publishers, including Universal Edition, Peermusic Classical, Éditions Alphonse Leduc, and Bärenreiter.

Presser Foundation
The publishing company that Presser founded was so successful that in 1906, Presser was able to express his appreciation to those who made this success possible by establishing the Presser Home for Retired Music Teachers located on West Johnson Street in the Mount Airy section of Philadelphia. His philanthropic zeal is continued to this day through his foresight in forming the Presser Foundation in 1916, nine years before his death. Each year, the Presser Foundation awards scholarships, grants, and funds specifically to further the cause of music and music education in America.

Composers published by Theodore Presser

Samuel Adler
William Albright
Martin Amlin
Daniel Asia
P.D.Q. Bach
Seymour Barab
Irwin Bazelon
Warren Benson
Chester Biscardi
William Bolcom
Victoria Bond
Louis Calabro
Ronald Caltabiano
Chen Yi
Valerie Coleman
Ruth Crawford
Daniel Dorff
John Downey
Henri Dutilleux
Donald Erb
Eric Ewazen
David Felder
Carlos Gardels
Ricky Ian Gordon
Adolphus Hailstork
Iain Hamilton
Donald Harris
Michael Hersch
Lejaren Hiller
Katherine Hoover
Huang Ruo
Charles Ives
Stephen Jaffe
Robert Jager
Martin Kennedy
Earl Kim
William Kraft
Ezra Laderman
Henri Lazarof
David Leisner
Gerald Levinson
Peter Scott Lewis
Lowell Liebermann
Philip Maneval
James Matheson
William Mayer
John Melby
Robert Moevs
Robert Muczynski
Jeffrey Mumford
Jeff Nichols
Carter Pann
Thomas Pasatieri
George Perle
Vincent Persichetti
Marta Ptaszynska
Shulamit Ran
Behzad Ranjbaran
Jay Reise
George Rochberg
Bernard Rogers
Carl Ruggles
Peter Schickele
Gary Schocker
William Schuman
Amy Scurria
Sophie Seipt
Roger Sessions
Ralph Shapey
Louise Siddall
Netty Simons
Nellie Bangs Skelton
Hale Smith
Julia Frances Smith
Louise Spizizen
Louise E. Stairs
Steven Stucky
Robert Suderburg
Francis Thorne
George Tsontakis
J. Lilian Vandevere
Cecile Vashaw
Marion Verhaalen
Hazel Volkart
Marion Vree
Melinda Wagner
Caroline Holme Walker
David Ward-Steinman
Mabel Madison Watson
Alliene Brandon Webb
Hugo Weisgall
Dan Welcher
Richard Wernick
Roger Zare
Ellen Taaffe Zwilich
Narong Prangcharoen

See also
 Music Publishers Association

References

Further reading

External links

Theodore Presser Company (Official Site)
The Presser Foundation
Complete Listing of Composers Published by Theodore Presser
Complete listing of Music Publishers Affiliated with Theodore Presser
Carl Fischer Music
 (publisher page)

Music publishing companies of the United States
Companies based in Montgomery County, Pennsylvania
Sheet music publishing companies
United States National Medal of Arts recipients
Publishing companies established in 1883
1883 establishments in Pennsylvania